Henri Arnold Seyrig (10 November 1895 – 21 January 1973) was a French archaeologist, numismatist, and historian. He was the general director of antiquities of Syria and Lebanon since 1929, and director, for more than twenty years, of the Institute of Archaeology of Beirut.

Early life
Henri was born in Héricourt, France to a liberal bourgeois industrial family. His family moved to Mulhouse when his father joined the family business, he was schooled in German. He was later sent to a French Protestant private boarding school in Normandy, Ecole des Roches, Seyrig continued his education in English at Oxford until 1914.

During World War I, Seyrig fought at Verdun and was decorated. In 1917 Seyrig joined the Orient contingent in Salonika where he had his first encounter with archeology and left his family business. He then attended the Sorbonne where he presented a thesis about the Homeric House and in 1922 was admitted to the French School at Athens where he spent seven years as a member and was promoted to secretary general's office.

Career

In 1929, Seyrig was called recommended by the master of Levantine archaeology René Dussaud and was appointed General director of antiquities of Syria and Lebanon which were under French mandate. Seyrig created the French institute of archaeology in Beirut which he headed for 20 years. He moved to New York City in 1942 where he worked as a special envoy of The Free French Government until the end of the war then he returned to Beirut.

Throughout the 1950s/60s he was a visiting scholar invited by the Institute for Advanced Study in Princeton, New Jersey, living part of the year in the United States. In 1967 he left Beirut and retired in Switzerland and continued with his wife, Hermine de Saussure, to spend part of the year in Princeton. Their children were actress Delphine Seyrig and composer Francis Seyrig.

He was awarded the medal of the Royal Numismatic Society in 1961.

Publications

References

External links
 Profile, production-scientifique.bnf.fr; accessed 21 February 2016.
 Henri Seyrig on data.bnf.fr

1895 births
1973 deaths
People from Héricourt, Haute-Saône
French Calvinist and Reformed Christians
French archaeologists
French military personnel of World War I
Directors of the Louvre
Members of the French School at Athens
20th-century archaeologists
Phoenician-punic archaeologists
Corresponding Fellows of the British Academy